The Kingston Hill Farm, also known as the Potter-Peckham Farm, is a historic farm in South Kingstown, Rhode Island.  The  farm is centered on a building complex with a c. 1810 -story wood frame farmhouse, which follows a typical plan of five bays with a central chimney.  Behind the house are a seed barn and wagon shed, both dating to the early 20th century.  A family cemetery with 18th-century graves is located near the southern boundary of the property.  The farm was first established by William Potter in the 1730s; by the early 18th century it came into the hands of Elisha Reynolds Potter, who operated it as a tenant farm.  Potter tore down the original farmhouse and built the now-surviving smaller house.

The farm was listed on the National Register of Historic Places in 1993.

See also
National Register of Historic Places listings in Washington County, Rhode Island

References

Farms on the National Register of Historic Places in Rhode Island
Houses in South Kingstown, Rhode Island
Farms in Washington County, Rhode Island
Historic districts in Washington County, Rhode Island
Historic districts on the National Register of Historic Places in Rhode Island
National Register of Historic Places in Washington County, Rhode Island
1730s establishments in Rhode Island